Evangelical Presbyterian Church may refer to:

 Evangelical Presbyterian Church (Australia)
 Evangelical Presbyterian Church in Bolivia
 Evangelical Presbyterian Church in Chile
 Evangelical Presbyterian Church in England and Wales
 Evangelical Presbyterian Church, Ghana
 Evangelical Presbyterian Church (Ireland)
 Evangelical Presbyterian Church of Malawi
 Evangelical Presbyterian Church of Myanmar
 Evangelical Presbyterian Church of Peru
 Evangelical Presbyterian Church in Portugal
 Evangelical Presbyterian Church of Ukraine
 Evangelical Presbyterian Church (United States), established in 1981
 Evangelical Presbyterian Church (established 1956), a denomination that, through a series of mergers, eventually became part of the Presbyterian Church in America